Fossurin í Fossá is one of the highest waterfalls in the Faroe Islands, and one of the biggest attractions in northern Streymoy.

"Fossá" in the Faroese language means "river with waterfalls", and there are several streams in Faroe Island with such a name.

The waterfall is located near the village of Haldarsvík, in the Sunda Kommuna municipality. It goes cascading 140 metres down to the sea in two stages. It is possible that in the height of falls is included also the run of the stream between the falls and the sea, which has a height difference of some 30 m.

References

External links
 Highest waterfall on the Faeroe Islands on YouTube

Streymoy
Waterfalls of the Faroe Islands